Engine House No. 4 may refer to:
 Mechanics Engine House No. 4, Macon, Georgia
 Engine House No. 4 (Tacoma, Washington)

See also
Engine House (disambiguation)